Ross McKitrick (born 1965) is a Canadian economist specializing in environmental economics and policy analysis. He is a professor of economics at the University of Guelph, and a senior fellow of the Fraser Institute.

McKitrick has authored works about environmental economics and ones opposing the scientific consensus on climate change, including co-authoring the book Taken by Storm: The Troubled Science, Policy and Politics of Global Warming, published in 2002. He is the author of Economic Analysis of Environmental Policy, published by the University of Toronto Press.

Biography
McKitrick gained his doctorate in economics in 1996 from the University of British Columbia, and in the same year was appointed assistant professor in the Department of Economics at the University of Guelph, Ontario.  In 2001 he received an associate professorship and has been a full professor since December 2008. He has also been a senior fellow of the Fraser Institute since 2002. He is a member of the academic advisory board of the Global Warming Policy Foundation.

Writing
McKitrick has authored works about environmental economics and ones opposing climate science. The book Taken by Storm, co-authored with Christopher Essex in 2002, was a runner-up for the Donner Prize. The book Economic Analysis of Environmental Policy was published by University of Toronto Press in 2011. McKitrick was involved in disputing hockey stick graph temperature reconstructions.

References

External links 
 McKitrick's publications and papers
 

Living people
Canadian economists
University of British Columbia alumni
Academic staff of the University of Guelph
1965 births